Trichosea diffusa is a species of moth of the family Noctuidae. It is found in Asia, including India, Taiwan Nepal, and Thailand.

The wingspan is 34–44 mm.

References

Moths described in 1986
Pantheinae